Peter J. Barnes III (April 26, 1956 – February 22, 2021) was an American Democratic Party politician, who served in the New Jersey Senate, where he represented the 18th Legislative District until 2016, when he was appointed New Jersey Superior Court judge. He previously served in the General Assembly from 2007 to 2014. Barnes previously served on the Assembly Judiciary Committee (as Vice-Chair), the Appropriations Committee and the Environment and Solid Waste Committee.

Biography
Barnes was born in San Francisco, California, but grew up primarily in Edison, New Jersey. He attended the Edison Township Public Schools, having attended Menlo Park Elementary School, John Adams Junior High School and J. P. Stevens High School. Barnes graduated in 1978 with a B.A. from Gettysburg College in political science, a Master of Business Administration from Fairleigh Dickinson University in management in 1980, and was awarded a Juris Doctor by the Widener University School of Law in 1985.

Barnes lived in Edison. He and his wife, Katie, had three children. He served on the Edison, New Jersey Township Council from 1996 to 2007, and on the Township's Planning Board from 2001 to 2003.

Barnes entered the New Jersey General Assembly in 2007, when he succeeded his father Peter J. Barnes Jr., who was nominated by Governor Jon Corzine to serve as chairman of the New Jersey State Parole Board. On March 14, 2007, Barnes Jr. was confirmed by the New Jersey Senate and Barnes III, was chosen to fill his father's vacant seat.<ref>Assembly OKs online database of Legislature's votes , Home News Tribune by Gregory J. Volpe, March 15, 2007</ref>

On November 5, 2013, he was elected to the State Senate, succeeding Barbara Buono who was running for Governor. In one of the closest Senate races in the state, Barnes defeated Democrat-turned-Republican East Brunswick mayor David Stahl by a 4% margin. He was the only new Senator elected in the 2013 elections as incumbent Senators won in the other 39 districts.

Superior Court judge
In April 2016,  Barnes was nominated by New Jersey Governor Chris Christie and the New Jersey Senate voted 34–0 to give him approval to become a New Jersey Superior Court judge sitting at Middlesex County Courthouse.

Death
Barnes died from cancer at Robert Wood Johnson University Hospital in New Brunswick on February 22, 2021, at age 64.

Tribute
On August 10, 2021, the Dismal Swamp, located in Middlesex County, New Jersey, was renamed as the Peter J. Barnes III Wildlife Preserve.

Election history

References

External links
 Barnes's legislative web page, New Jersey Legislature
 New Jersey Legislature financial disclosure forms''
 2015 2014 2013 2012 2011 2010 2009 2008 2007 2006
Peter J. Barnes III, Project Vote Smart

1956 births
2021 deaths
21st-century American judges
21st-century American politicians
Deaths from cancer in New Jersey
Fairleigh Dickinson University alumni
Gettysburg College alumni
J. P. Stevens High School alumni
Democratic Party members of the New Jersey General Assembly
New Jersey city council members
New Jersey state court judges
Democratic Party New Jersey state senators
People from Edison, New Jersey
Politicians from Middlesex County, New Jersey
Politicians from San Francisco
Widener University School of Law alumni